Daniel Coleman (born February 13, 1985) is an American former professional basketball player. In the 2013–14 season he played for the GasTerra Flames in the Netherlands.

Professional career
Coleman started his career with A.D. Vagos in the Portuguese LPB. In his first year, he averaged 18.5 points and 7.8 rebounds per game and was named the league's Most Valuable Player.

The next two year he played with JL Bourg-en-Bresse in the French second tier LNB Pro B.

In the 2013–14 season Coleman played for the GasTerra Flames in the Dutch Basketball League. With Flames he won the 'double'; both the league championship and cup championship was won by the team.

References

1985 births
Living people
American expatriate basketball people in the Netherlands
American expatriate basketball people in France
American expatriate basketball people in Finland
American expatriate basketball people in Portugal
American men's basketball players
Basketball players from Minneapolis
Donar (basketball club) players
Dutch Basketball League players
JA Vichy players
JL Bourg-en-Bresse players
Kataja BC players
Minnesota Golden Gophers men's basketball players
Power forwards (basketball)
Sioux Falls Skyforce players
Small forwards
Hopkins High School alumni